Mat Taram bin Sa'al (alias Utoh) was an Indonesian mass murderer who killed eleven people and wounded ten others on a Kuala Lumpur-bound train and a kongsi near Bangi, Malaysia on October 9, 1947. He was acquitted by reason of insanity.

Utoh was a Banjarese padi planter hailing from Tunggal Island near Sumatra. He owned a farm in Parit Six, Bagan Terap, near Teluk Anson, but when he wanted to return to his birthplace, he sold his house and land for 200 Straits dollar, and together with his wife and three children took the train to Singapore, to inquire the price for the journey. Upon finding that he could not afford the fee for the ferry, he became depressed, and, according to his wife, stayed awake for two days, but eventually he decided to return to Parit Six. On October 9 he and his family went to Labis by bus, where they boarded the mail train from Singapore to Kuala Lumpur.

For most of the journey 30-year-old Utoh remained quiet, but at about 6:10 p.m., when the train had just passed Bangi and was on its way to Kajang, he entered the restaurant car, drew a pocket knife with a four-inch blade and attacked four British Other Ranks of the Malaya Command Signals Regiment, who were having dinner at one of the tables. He killed sergeant Herbert Victor Marston by stabbing him in the heart, fatally stabbed J. Cormack in the abdomen, grievously injured Robert Ralston with a stab in the chest, and also stabbed a Malay named Mohamed Eusoff, as well as an Indian named Malimalai, who succumbed to his chest wound on October 12.

When the train was brought to an emergency halt, Utoh jumped off and disappeared into the jungle. Under a bridge near the railway tracks he stabbed a Chinese vagrant to death, and three miles further on entered a kongsi hut near Sungai Tangkas where he killed Cheow Hin, as well as two elderly women, and three children, and wounded nine other people, among them four children, before fleeing. Police arrived at the hut about one hour later, whereupon the wounded were brought to hospital. One of them, a woman, succumbed to her wounds soon thereafter.

While hundreds of police officers were searching for him in the jungle around Bangi, Utoh went on a 90-mile march to his home in Parit Six, where he arrived 36 hours later. Upon being asked why he had returned, since it was thought that he was on his way to Sumatra, he told that he had no money for the trip and was on his way back home, but he had lost his wife and children when he was pushed out of the train after a fight that was incited by a Chinese boy who had spilt tea on him. Utoh was then brought to Sabak Bernam Police Station where he related his story, telling that he couldn't remember anything that happened after he was pushed off the train. One of the policemen, who had read the story about the mass murder in a newspaper, suspected that he could be the sought culprit, and so Utoh was arrested.

Utoh was detained in Teluk Anson, where he was identified by his wife, and charged with the murder of Herbert Marston on October 13. The case was then transferred to the court in Kajang, where hearings began on October 14. On October 29 Utoh was sent to the mental hospital in Tanjong Rambutan to be observed there for a month. On May 4, 1948 he was found to have been of unsound mind while committing the murders and was sentenced to be confined at the mental hospital in Tanjong Rambutan at the pleasure of the Ruler-in-Council.

Victims

Those wounded were: Robert Ralston, Mohamed Eusoff, Liew Ngan, 8, Liew Fah, 14, Liew See Tai, 13, Chong Kew, 13, Ng Lan, 50, Chong Shuen, Wong Yee and Chin Sam.

References

External links
Malay runs amok, kills 8, The Daily News (October 10, 1947)
Frenzied Malayan runs amok in train, Cairns Post (October 11, 1947)
Maniacal murderer is still at large, The Mirror (October 11, 1947)
Malay runs amok on train with pocket knife, The Canberra Times (October 11, 1947) 
Malay, amok, kills 9, wounds 12, The Sunday Times (October 12, 1947)
Demented Malay found 150 miles from murder scene, The Canberra Times (October 13, 1947)
Strange sequel to Malayan murders, The Examiner (October 13, 1947)
Malay killer surrenders to police, The Advertiser (October 13, 1947)
Costly fares made Malayan a killer, Barrier Miner (October 14, 1947)
Kill me or set me free, Cairns Post (May 5, 1948)
Killed 11 on train, The Northern Miner (May 6, 1948)

1910s births
Mass murder in 1947
Indonesian mass murderers
Indonesian murderers of children
Massacres in Malaysia
Living people
People acquitted by reason of insanity